Sied Chahrour, better known by his stage names Pittsburgh Slim and later as Slimmie and Slimmie Hendrix is an American rapper from Pittsburgh, Pennsylvania, United States, of mixed Algerian and Mexican origins. Previously signed to Def Jam Recordings as Pittsburgh Slim (until 2009), he is now signed to Snowballers Entertainment with his new adopted name Slimmie Hendrix.

Biography
Chahrour was born and raised in the Greenfield neighborhood of Pittsburgh, Pennsylvania, to an Algerian father and a part-Mexican mother. He began working on rap music while attending Allderdice High School. He played in guitar in rock bands and had a strong presence in the local rap community, working the likes of producer E. Dan and rapper Wiz Khalifa.  He opened many local shows for artists such as Nelly, Jurassic 5, Usher, Nas, The Roots, Ja Rule and 50 Cent.

Chahrour relocated to Los Angeles, California and worked as a waiter while he continued to pursue music. Chahrour conceived of a song based on the line "I like when girls kiss girls", and turned to North Carolina-based producer David Willis, also known as Ski Beatz, for help with the production. For the song, "Girls Kiss Girls", they made a music video featuring Penthouse magazine model Krista Ayne, inspired by a scene from the 1999 film American Pie. The video became a sensation on the video sharing website YouTube and the song started to get played on radio stations across the U.S., beginning with KISS-FM in Pittsburgh.

Chahrour began receiving offers from record labels to release the single, but held out for an offer to make an album. Chahrour met with rapper and Def Jam Recordings CEO Jay-Z, and was offered a five-album deal with the label. He signed with the label because of Jay-Z; Chahrour had come up with the name Pittsburgh Slim four years earlier, based on a line from Jay-Z's song, "So Ghetto" from Vol. 3... Life and Times of S. Carter, where he rapped "Iceberg, Slim, baby ride rims", referencing author and pimp Iceberg Slim.

Chahrour released the single "Girls Kiss Girls". The song gained popularity from its video on YouTube, leading Jay-Z to sign him to Def Jam Recordings on a 5-album deal, where he released his solo debut LP, Tastemaker (EP), on 4 December 2007 Chahrour appeared on Last Call with Carson Daly on December 11, 2007 and appeared in the film The Bleeding where he appeared in the role of Crash. The film starred Vinnie Jones, Michael Matthias, Michael Madsen, DMX and Armand Assante. Chahrour left Def Jam in late 2008. Mostly known for his sexually-explicit lyrics, he released the single "My Bitch is Crazy" from the Bleeding soundtrack through the iTunes Store in January 2009. His mixtape "Nolita Nights" was released in August, 2009. These works were all credited to his stage name Pittsburgh Slim.

He came back in 2011 under a new stage name Slimmie Hendrix with the album Steezington Ave that includes collaborations with DJ Adam 12, Tony Adams, Dirt Nasty, Tekneek and Axident.

Discography

As Pittsburgh Slim
LPs
2007: Tastemaker (EP), Def Jam Recordings - debut LP

Singles
2007: "Girls Kiss Girls", Def Jam
2009: "My Bitch is Crazy", Now City Productions
2019: “Do You Ever Stop and Smell the Roses?”, Self-Released
2019: ”A Guide to Life”, Self-Released
2019: ”Strung out on Electricity”; Self-Released

Mixtapes
2007: Downtown Wednesday Night
2009: Nolita Nights
2012: Pittsburgh Slim's Excellent Adventure
 2013: And The Beat Goes On...
 2013: Instaglam

As Slimmie Hendrix
LPs
2011: Steezington Ave, Snowballers Entertainment

Singles
2011: "The Skinny Bitches Have More Fun"

Filmography

See also
 Wiz Khalifa
 Ke$ha
 Jay-Z
 Ray Kay
 Ski Beatz
 Camp Lo

Notes

References

 Jentzen, Aaron (November 29, 2007) "A Conversation with Pittsburgh Slim". Pittsburgh City Paper. Retrieved on February 23, 2008.
 Mervis, Scott (November 11, 2007). "Jay-Z taps hip-hopper with local roots as next 'Tastemaker'". Pittsburgh Post-Gazette. Retrieved on February 23, 2008.

 Interview with Pittsburgh Slim at Adult Industry Press

External links
 Slimmie Hendrix Official website
 
 

American rappers
Def Jam Recordings artists
Musicians from Pittsburgh
Living people
Year of birth missing (living people)
Taylor Allderdice High School alumni
21st-century American rappers
American people of Algerian descent
American musicians of Mexican descent